Freewheeling is a 2000 Italian comedy film written, directed and starred by Vincenzo Salemme.

Plot  
Pericle Caruso lives in Naples, and is in a wheelchair because of a bad surgery in hospital. Pericle intends to sue the rich owner of the clinic: a stingy and cruel baron, and so he falls on purpose of his wife ...

Cast 

Vincenzo Salemme as Pericle Caruso
Carlo Buccirosso as  Mario Pecorella
Sabrina Ferilli as   Silvia
Manuela Arcuri as Maria Grazia
Maurizio Casagrande as  Lawyer Cardamone 
Massimo Ceccherini as  Natalizia
Nando Paone as  Beatrice

References

External links

2000 films
Italian comedy films
2000 comedy films
Films directed by Vincenzo Salemme
2000s Italian-language films